East Branch Verdigre Creek is a -long third-order tributary to Verdigre Creek in Knox County, Nebraska.  This stream along with South Branch Verdigre Creek forms Verdigre Creek.

Course
East Branch Verdigre Creek rises on the Elkhorn River divide about 1.5 miles southeast of Royal, Nebraska and then flows north-northwest to join South Branch Verdigre Creek to form Verdigre Creek about 8 miles east-southeast of Venus, Nebraska.

Watershed
East Branch Verdigre Creek drains  of area, receives about 26.2 in/year of precipitation, has a wetness index of 564.29, and is about 5.53% forested.

See also

List of rivers of Nebraska

References

Rivers of Antelope County, Nebraska
Rivers of Knox County, Nebraska
Rivers of Nebraska